F. nepalensis may refer to:

 Fejervarya nepalensis, a frog native to Asia
 Frullania nepalensis, a liverwort with thin, leaf-like flaps on either side of the stem